The women's 100 metres hurdles event at the 2008 World Junior Championships in Athletics was held in Bydgoszcz, Poland, at Zawisza Stadium on 10, 11 and 12 July.

Medalists

Results

Final
12 July
Wind: -2.4 m/s

Semifinals
11 July

Semifinal 1
Wind: -0.3 m/s

Semifinal 2
Wind: -0.3 m/s

Semifinal 3
Wind: -1.5 m/s

Heats
10 July

Heat 1
Wind: -1.3 m/s

Heat 2
Wind: -1.8 m/s

Heat 3
Wind: -1.6 m/s

Heat 4
Wind: +1.2 m/s

Heat 5
Wind: -2.0 m/s

Participation
According to an unofficial count, 41 athletes from 33 countries participated in the event.

References

100 metres hurdles
Sprint hurdles at the World Athletics U20 Championships
2008 in women's athletics